The Silver Chamber of Sorrows (Traditional Chinese: 銀樓金粉) is a TVB period drama series broadcast in April 2008. It stars Nancy Sit, Paul Chun, Ng Wai Kwok, Christine Ng, Shirley Yeung, Winnie Young, Jack Wu, Rebecca Chan & Nancy Wu.

Synopsis
A rich family is ruled by lust
A hymn is mourned over by feuds
Sheung's Silver Chamber, the largest jewel company in Foshan, Guangdong, is facing serious financial difficulties. In order to obtain a loan from Shum’s family, Sheung Hang (Paul Chun), owner of the Chamber, together with his primary wife, Choi Siu-Tip (Nancy Sit), plot to arrange marriage between Sheung Wan (Ng Wai Kwok), Hang’s younger brother, and Shum Wing-Tung (Winnie Young), daughter of Shum’s family. Fueled by hatred, Ching Sau-Hang (Christine Ng), Wan’s lover, marries Hang and ironically becomes Wan’s sister-in-law. Wan falls out with Hang, and opts to live abroad and disconnects from his family.

After leaving home for years, Wan does not return home until the occasion to celebrate his father’s birthday. Unfortunately on the night before the occasion, Sheung Shai Jo, the only son of Hang, steals his grandfather's present for his greed and as a result causes his grandfather to agitate and pass away while his mother pushed the blame to Hang, Wan and Sau-Hang. As a result, all the evil deeds and secrets of the family are revealed one by one as the dark age of the family approaches...

Cast

Viewership ratings

Awards and nominations
41st TVB Anniversary Awards (2008)

Nominations
 "Best Drama"
 "Best Actress in a Leading Role" (Nancy Sit - Choi Siu-Dip)
 "Best Actress in a Supporting Role" (Nancy Wu - Ha Fei-Fei)
 "My Favourite Female Character" (Christine Ng - Ching Sau-Hang)

References

External links
TVB.com The Silver Chamber of Sorrows - Official Website 
 Review

TVB dramas
2008 Hong Kong television series debuts
2008 Hong Kong television series endings